Leptorhynchos is a genus of annual or perennial herbs in the family Asteraceae. All species are endemic to Australia. These include:

References

Gnaphalieae
Asteraceae genera
Endemic flora of Australia